This is a list of Roman governors of Gallia Belgica. Capital and largest city of Gallia Belgica was Durocortum, modern-day Reims.

Governors during the Principate

AD 69-96: Year of the Four Emperors and Flavian Dynasty 
 AD 69-70: Decimus Valerius Asiaticus
 94-97: Quintus Glitius Atilius Agricola

AD 96-192: Nervan-Antonian dynasty 
 97-99: Quintus Sosius Senecio
 AD 137-141: Tiberius Claudius Saturninus
 c. 159-c. 162: Aulus Junius Pastor Lucius Caesennius Sospes
 c. 166: Lucius Calpurnius Proculus
 c. 171-c. 175: Didius Julianus

AD 193-235: Year of the Five Emperors and Severan dynasty 
 c. 180-c. 183: Gaius Sabucius Major Caecilianus
 Between 183 and 186, or 186 and 189: Lucius Calpurnius Proculus
 Between 200 and 203: Gaius Junius Faustinus Placidus Postumianus
 Between 200 and 204: Lucius Marius Maximus Perpetuus Aurelianus
 Between 202 and 209: Lucius Publius Postumus
 Between 222 and 224: Gaius Julius Apronius Maenius Pius Salamallianus

References 

!
Gallia Belgica
Gallia Belgica